Shazelina Zainul Abidin is a Malaysian diplomat. She was previously the Malaysian ambassador to Senegal, with concurrent accreditation to Burkina Faso, Mali, The Gambia and Cabo Verde.

Prior to her stint in Africa, Shazelina was the Head of Communications and Public Diplomacy for the Ministry of Foreign Affairs Malaysia, and has had postings to Washington DC (2001–2003) and to New York, at the Permanent Mission of Malaysia to the United Nations (2007–2011).

Shazelina maintains strong links to the academic world with her appointment as an Honorary Research Fellow at the University of Sheffield. 

Shazelina is currently the Director General of the Institute of Diplomacy and Foreign Relations (IDFR) ,the training arm of the Ministry of Foreign Affairs (Malaysia), and charts the training of the next generation of Malaysian diplomats.

Education 
She attended Sekolah Seri Puteri boarding school. She graduated with a B.A. (Hons) from Queen Mary University of London, her Masters from the University of Edinburgh and her PhD from the University of Sheffield. She joined the Foreign Ministry in 1996.

Career 
In 2009, she was a member of the Malaysian delegation to the United Nations. In 2013, she was on the host committee of the Global Summit of Women.

In 2019, she appeared at a Supdeco conference.

For her work in Senegal, Shazelina was awarded the prestigious National Order of the Lion at the rank of Commander by the President of the Republic of Senegal, Mr Macky Sall, in 2021.

Shazelina has her own monthly column in the New Straits Times and a blog on diplomacy and diplomatic practices, ofdiplomacy.com .

Honours 
:
 Commander of the National Order of the Lion (2021)

References

External links 
Son Excellence Dr Shazelina Zainul Abidin ambassadrice de la Malaisie soutient l'association N Jaboo, 2019
TH Receives Courtesy Visit From Senegal, 2020

Malaysian women diplomats
Living people
Malaysian diplomats
Malaysian women ambassadors
Ambassadors of Malaysia to Cape Verde
Ambassadors of Malaysia to Mali
Ambassadors of Malaysia to Senegal
Ambassadors of Malaysia to Burkina Faso
Ambassadors of Malaysia to the Gambia
Alumni of the University of Sheffield
1972 births
Recipients of orders, decorations, and medals of Senegal